"ADMV" (short for "Amor de Mi Vida"; English: "Love of My Life") is a song by Colombian singer Maluma. Co-written by Maluma, Stiven Rojas, Vicente Barco, and Edgar Barrera, the lattermost of whom also produced the song, it was released by Sony Music Latin on April 23, 2020. The song topped the charts in Colombia, Costa Rica, Guatemala, Chile, Panama, Paraguay, Mexico, and the Dominican Republic; it also reached the top ten in Puerto Rico, El Salvador, Honduras, Uruguay and, Venezuela.

Background and composition
Maluma teased the song in his Instagram Account, In 17 April 2020. and a Sneak Peak of His Music Video. Maluma stated that "ADMV" was written during a trip to Jamaica. The song depicts "a man who lives out his life with the love of his life", and it has been described as a "stripped-down, acoustic ballad". Regarding its lyrics, Maluma stated: "I'm single right now, but [...] of course I dream about [...] when I get old with someone and live different things". On May 18, 2020, Maluma released an "urban version" of the song, titled "ADMV (Versión Urbana)", which incorporates a "reggaetón beat".

Music video
The Nuno Gomes-directed music video was released on April 23, 2020. It depicts Maluma as a hopelessly-in-love elderly man.

Live performances
Maluma performed "ADMV" on the April 30, 2020 episode of The Tonight Show Starring Jimmy Fallon. In June, he performed it during the digital commencement event Dear Class of 2020.

Charts

Weekly charts

Year-end charts

Certifications

Release history

See also
List of Billboard number-one Latin songs of 2020

References

External links

2020 singles
2020 songs
Maluma songs
Song recordings produced by Edgar Barrera
Songs written by Maluma (singer)
Spanish-language songs